Heinz Hille (1891 – 15 May 1954) was a German screenwriter, film producer and director.

Selected filmography
 You Will Be My Wife (1932)
 The Old Scoundrel (1932)
 The Cheeky Devil (1932)
 And the Plains Are Gleaming (1933)
 Autobus S (1937)
 Falstaff in Vienna (1940)

References

Bibliography
 Cunningham, John. Hungarian Cinema: From Coffee House to Multiplex. Wallflower Press, 2004.

External links

1891 births
1954 deaths
Film people from North Rhine-Westphalia